Andreas Tsoumanis (alternate spelling: Antreas) (born July 15, 2001) is a Greek professional basketball player for Sagrado Corazón Cáceres of the Liga EBA. He is a 2.03 m (6'8") tall small forward-power forward.

Professional career
Tsoumanis began his pro career in 2018, during the 2017–18 season, with the Greek Basket League club Olympiacos. For the 2019–20 season, he was assigned to play in the Greek 2nd Division, with Olympiacos' reserve team, Olympiacos B. On September 6, 2020, Tsoumanis was loaned out to Eleftheroupoli for the 2020–2021 season.

National team career
Tsoumanis played with the junior national teams of Greece. With Greece's junior national teams, he won a gold medal at the 2017 FIBA U16 European Championship Division B. He also played at the 2018 FIBA U18 European Championship.

References

External links
EuroLeague Under-18 Profile
FIBA Profile
Eurobasket.com Profile
Greek Basket League Profile 
RealGM.com Profile
DraftExpress.com Profile

2001 births
Living people
Greek men's basketball players
Olympiacos B.C. B players
Olympiacos B.C. players
Power forwards (basketball)
Small forwards
Sportspeople from Ioannina